Aïssata Deen Conte (born 4 September 2001) is a Guinean Olympic athlete.

Career
Conte competed at the 2018 Summer Youth Olympics in Buenos Aires however she was disqualified from the 400 metres race. Conte was selected to represent Guinea in the women's 100 metres race at the delayed 2020 Summer Games in Tokyo. However, Conte did not have a smooth run into the Games the Guinean sports ministry initially pulled all their athletes out of the event due the COVID-19 pandemic. This decision was rescinded two days before the opening ceremony allowing their athletes to compete at short notice. Despite the upheaval, Conte ran a personal best time for the 100 metres of 12.43 seconds.

References

2001 births
Living people
Olympic athletes of Guinea
Guinean female sprinters
Athletes (track and field) at the 2020 Summer Olympics
Olympic female sprinters